Navidad Boricua: Mi Pueblo esta de Fiesta is one of the compilations made by Puerto Rican artists with songs that reflect the Christmas tradition of Puerto Rico. In this album are various singers of Puerto Rico as Joseph Fonseca, Michael Stuart, Grupo Kaos, Plenéalo, Daniela Droz, Andy Montañez, Los Sabrosos del Merengue, Junny Ramos, Salsa Kids, Mary Ann Acevedo, among others. The last version of this compilation, Navidad Boricua has raised over half a million dollars to over fifteen foundations highly needed in the Island. All money raised from the album sales were destined for Puerto Rico Down Syndrome Foundation and the Foundation Anthony "Junior" Soto.

Track listing

Olvídate de la luz
Medley Pa' Parrandear:
El Fuá
Tengo una Juma
De Palo en Palo
Yo me tomo el Ron
Comadrita la Rana
Alegría y Bomba Eh'
El Arbolito
Boricuas de Corazón
Medley Plenarengue:
Alegre Vengo
Hermoso Bouquet
Ramillete
De la Montaña Venimos
Amanecer Borincano / De ahi vengo yo
Medley Plenas:
Aguinaldo Isabeleño
Pobre Lechón
Burrito Sabanero
Suena mi Tambora
*Source:

References

2007 Christmas albums
Christmas albums by Puerto Rican artists